Miss Venezuela 1970 was the 17th edition of Miss Venezuela pageant held at Teatro Nacional in Caracas, Venezuela, on July 1, 1970.  The winner of the pageant was Bella La Rosa, Miss Carabobo, who entered the contest by chance because her twin sister Linda La Rosa, who was originally competing, had to quit after having a horse fall.

The pageant was broadcast live by RCTV.

Results
Miss Venezuela 1970 - Bella La Rosa (Miss Carabobo)
1st runner-up - Tomasita de las Casas (Miss Miranda)
2nd runner-up - Sonia Ledezma (Miss Monagas)
3rd runner-up - Peggy Romero (Miss Departamento Vargas)
4th runner-up - Marisela Berti (Miss Nueva Esparta)

Special awards
 Miss Fotogénica (Miss Photogenic) - Marlene Agreda (Miss Aragua)
 Miss Amistad (Miss Friendship) - Reyna Noguera (Miss Guárico)
 Miss Cortesía (Miss Courtesy) - Peggy Romero (Miss Departamento Vargas)
 Miss Sonrisa (Best Smile) - Maigualida Leandro (Miss Bolívar)

Delegates

 Miss Anzoátegui - Rebeca Bendayán
 Miss Apure - Ingrid Gil Montero
 Miss Aragua - Marlene Agreda
 Miss Barinas - Yoly Tecca Castillo
 Miss Bolívar - Maigualida Leandro Martínez
 Miss Carabobo -  Bella Teresa de Jesús  La Rosa  de  la Rosa
 Miss Departamento Vargas - Peggy Romero Brito
 Miss Distrito Federal - Maria Antonieta Aponte
 Miss Guárico - Reyna Margarita Noguera Coimán
 Miss Mérida - Silvia Steiklauber
 Miss Miranda  - Tomasa Nina Josefina -Tomasita- de las Casas Mata
 Miss Monagas - Sonia Ledezma Corvo
 Miss Nueva Esparta - Marisela Berti Díaz
 Miss Sucre - Ninin Ohep Carrillo
 Miss Táchira - Morella Chacón
 Miss Zulia - Ada Alcira Urdaneta Nava

External links
Miss Venezuela official website

1970 beauty pageants
1970 in Venezuela